Precision-Paragon [P2] is a lighting manufacturer that is wholly owned by Hubbell Lighting Inc.  Headquartered in Yorba Linda, California, the company has manufacturing plants in Yorba Linda, California, Hudson, Wisconsin and Gainesville, Florida.

Company Profile
Precision-Paragon [P2] manufacturers fluorescent and LED based lighting fixtures designed for energy efficient lighting retrofits and new construction of commercial and industrial buildings.  Its products are designed to reduce energy consumption, and the company claims that cumulatively, its fixtures have reduced consumption by more than 12 billion kWh since 1992.

In 2011, Precision-Paragon [P2] conducted a survey among its customers which found that 75% of respondents expect the energy efficient lighting industry to grow in 2011.

History 
1992 - Company founded as Precision Fluorescent
2005 - Acquired by Varon Lighting Group
2009 - Varon Lighting Group acquired by Hubbell Incorporated
2009 - Precision-Lighting acquires Paragon Lighting, combined company renamed Precision-Paragon [P2].
2011 - Joe Martin becomes vice president and general manager of Precision-Paragon[P2]

References

External links 
 Precision-Paragon P2 Official Website

Lighting brands
Companies based in Orange County, California